Finn Ole Becker (born 8 June 2000) is a German professional footballer who plays as a midfielder for Bundesliga club 1899 Hoffenheim.

Early life
Becker attended the Bismarckschule in Elmshorn for high school, where he graduated in 2018.

He has two sisters and a brother.

Club career

Early career
Becker began playing football at TSV Sparrieshoop, for whom his father Dirk Becker had once played in the Landesliga. Until 30 June 2011, he was a player at Holsatia Elmshorn, where Bruno Harnau, who worked there as youth coordinator, introduced him to FC St. Pauli. He subsequently moved to St. Pauli on 1 July 2011 at the age of eleven.

In the 2015–16 season, Becker made 15 appearances in the Under 17 Bundesliga North/Northeast, providing an assist. He played in the Under 19 Bundesliga for the next two seasons, making 37 appearances in which he scored four goals and assisted two. In his final season for the St. Pauli under-19 team, Becker finished with 20 games, two goals and one assist.

FC St. Pauli
Becker made his professional debut for FC St. Pauli in the 2. Bundesliga under head coach Jos Luhukay on 14 April 2019, coming on as a substitute in the 87th minute for Ryō Miyaichi in the 1–1 home draw against Arminia Bielefeld. He thereby became the first player born in 2000 to make an appearance for the club. In his second game on 21 April against 1. FC Heidenheim, he came on for Christopher Buchtmann in the 45th minute, but was sent off in the 72nd minute after receiving his second yellow card. Becker made his first ever start on 3 May in the away game against Dynamo Dresden.

1899 Hoffenheim
As his contract with St. Pauli was set to expire, it was announced on 29 January 2022 that Becker would join Bundesliga club 1899 Hoffenheim as a free agent from the 2022–23 season. He signed a four-year contract.

International career
On 12 November 2017, Becker made his debut for the Germany U18 team under coach Guido Streichsbier at the age of 17 in a friendly match. He was in the starting lineup in a 3–1 win against Italy team and was substituted for Nick Bätzner in the 70th minute of the game.

References

External links
 Profile at DFB.de
 Profile at kicker.de
 

2000 births
Living people
German footballers
Germany youth international footballers
Germany under-21 international footballers
Association football midfielders
FC St. Pauli players
FC St. Pauli II players
TSG 1899 Hoffenheim players
Bundesliga players
2. Bundesliga players
Regionalliga players
People from Elmshorn
Footballers from Schleswig-Holstein